Smoky Falls is a community in Cochrane, Unorganized, North Part in Cochrane District, Ontario, Canada.

Climate

References

Communities in Cochrane District